Aivar Pilv (born 22 March 1961) is an Estonian lawyer.

In 1984, he graduated from Tartu State University in law specialty.

Since 1984, he is a member of Estonian Bar Association. 2004–2010, he was the head of the association. In 1993, he established his own judicial bureau: AS Advokaadibüroo Aivar Pilv.

He has been a major figure in big court cases, e.g. related to Andrus Veerpalu (Andrus Veerpalu v International Ski Federation) and Villu Reiljan.

References

External links

Living people
1961 births
20th-century Estonian lawyers
21st-century Estonian lawyers
University of Tartu alumni